Chloe Bull O'Connor (born 13 December 1994) is a Welsh footballer who plays as a midfielder for Bristol City playing in England's FA Women's Championship

Career

At the age of 15, Bull debuted for Welsh side Swansea City. In 2021, she signed for Bristol City in England.

References

External links

 Chloe Bull at playmakerstats.com 

1994 births
Bristol City W.F.C. players
Cardiff Met. Ladies F.C. players
Expatriate women's footballers in England
Living people
Swansea City Ladies F.C. players
Wales women's international footballers
Welsh women's footballers
Welsh Premier Women's Football League players
Women's association football midfielders
Women's Championship (England) players